10th Class  is a 2006 Indian Telugu-language romance film directed by Chandu and produced by Venkata Shyam Prasad under SP Entertainments. The film stars Bharath and Kadhal Saranya.

Cast
 Bharath as Srinu
 Saranya as Anjali
 Sunaina as Sandhya
 Jayalalitha
 Ali
 Krishna Bhagavaan
 Ravali
 Ashok Kumar K.

Soundtrack
The music was composed by Mickey J. Meyer and Released by Aditya Music.

Reception
A critic from Telugu Cinema opined that "All in all, it is very average teenage love story with some good music".

References

External links
 
 10th Pass Jobs

2000s Telugu-language films
Telugu films remade in other languages
Films scored by Mickey J Meyer
Indian teen romance films
2000s teen romance films